In general usage the word indigen is treated as a variant of the word indigene, meaning a native.

IndiGen Programme on Genomics for Public Health in India
The IndiGen programme on Genomics for Public Health in India is led by the CSIR Institute of Genomics and Integrative Biology and funded by CSIR India. The aim of the programme was to undertake whole genome sequencing of thousands of individuals representing diverse ethnic groups from India with the objective to enable genetic epidemiology and develop public health technologies applications using population genome data. The IndiGenome programme as announced complete by the Hon'ble Minister of Science and Technology. The IndiGenomes resource hosts searchable data on the programme. The programme has also leapfrogged India in the area of genomic business accelerating the adaptation of genomics in clinics and as well as stimulating Indian industry to develop and deploy products based on genomics for healthcare applications. A comprehensive searchable resource for the data is also available.

Usage in botany
However, it was used in a strictly botanical sense for the first time in 1918 by Liberty Hyde Bailey ((1858–1954) an American horticulturist, botanist and cofounder of the American Society for Horticultural Science) and described as a plant

 " of known habitat ". Later, in 1923, Bailey formally defined the indigen as:

Botanical definition 
 " ... a species of which we know the nativity, - one that is somewhere recorded as indigenous. " The term was coined to contrast with cultigen which he defined in the 1923 paper as:  " ... the species, or its equivalent, that has appeared under domestication, – the plant is cultigenous."

See also
 Cultigen
 Alien (biology)
 Native
 Naturalization (biology)

References 

Botany